Rhochmopterum centrale is a species of tephritid or fruit flies in the genus Rhochmopterum of the family Tephritidae.

Distribution
Taiwan.

References

Tephritinae
Insects described in 1915
Diptera of Asia